Jo Han-chul (Korean: 조한철; born June 13, 1973)  is a South Korean actor. He is best known for his roles in 100 Days My Prince (2018), Vincenzo (2021), Hometown Cha-Cha-Cha (2021), and Jirisan (2021).

He graduated from the Department of Theater and Film at Cheongju University with Bachelor Degree and graduated from the Department of Acting at the Korea National University of Arts and Drama with Master Degree.

Career 

He debuted as theater actor in 1998 in play One Room. A year later he debuted in movie Peppermint Candy as small role.

After two decades, his breakthrough as an actor came for his role as after-life prosecutor in a box office Along with the Gods: The Last 49 Days. Joo wasn't first choice for this work. He replaced Oh Dal-su who resigned from the movie.

In the same year he also got his breakthrough in television drama with his role as a King in 100 Days My Prince (Korean: 백일의 낭군님; Hanja: 百日의 郎君님; RR: Baegirui Nanggunnim; lit. Hundred-Day Husband). This 2018 historical tvN  drama is the eleventh highest-rated Korean drama in cable television. He was cast as a substitute for actor Yoon Tae-young.

Filmography

Film

Television

Web series

Stage

Theater

Musical

Discography

Singles

Awards and nominations

References

External links 

 
Jo Han-chul at Daum Encyclopedia 
Jo Han-chul at Movie Daum 
Jo Han-chul at Naver 
Jo Han-chul at Play DB 
Jo Han-chul at Noon Company 

South Korean male web series actors
Living people
1973 births
21st-century South Korean male actors
Male actors from Seoul
South Korean male actors
South Korean male film actors
South Korean male musical theatre actors
South Korean male stage actors
South Korean male television actors
South Korean television personalities